Sydney Jacobs (1867 – 17 October 1932) was a New Zealand cricketer. He played in one first-class match for Wellington in 1899/1900.

See also
 List of Wellington representative cricketers

References

External links
 

1867 births
1962 deaths
New Zealand cricketers
Wellington cricketers
Sportspeople from Wiltshire